Veodalen is a valley in Lom and Vågå municipalities in Innlandet county, Norway. The valley begins at the Veobreen glacier, which is surrounded by the mountains Veobretinden, Veopallan, and Veotinden in the Jotunheimen mountains. The valley then follows the river Veo to the east. The valley ends where the river joins the river Sjoa and the valley becomes part of the larger Sjodalen valley. The inner half of the valley is located inside Jotunheimen National Park.

References

Valleys of Innlandet
Vågå
Lom, Norway
Jotunheimen